Mohamed Sohel Rana (Bengali: মোহাম্মদ সোহেল রানা; born 1 June 1996), also known as Shohel Rana, is a Bangladeshi professional footballer who plays for Bangladesh Premier League club Abahani Limited Dhaka and the Bangladesh national team. As a versatile midfielder, he can operate either as a defensive midfielder, central midfielder, attacking midfielder or wide midfielder.

Club career

Early years
When Sohel was third-grader in 2005, his father provided him Tk 350 to buy a pair of football boots, even though his family was going through a financial crisis at the time. Nonetheless, the investment did not go to vain as, Sohel went onto play the Danone Nations Cup (U-13) tournament and the Bangabandhu Gold Cup primary school football tournament. In 2014, Sohel guided his school, Bibir Bazar High School from Comilla, as they won the National School Football Championship.

However, poverty drove him to a job in the Bangladesh Army. He finished as the highest scorer in the inter-service football competition as, Bangladesh Army became champions by beating a star studded Bangladesh Navy team, which included national team duo Mamunul Islam and Raihan Hasan. After the tournament ended, Rahmatganj MFS coach Golam Jilani, who had seen Sohel play before finally made a decision to sign him for the upcoming 2018–19 Bangladesh Premier League season. This gave Sohel a chance to play in the country's top-tier without having to play the lower division leagues, making up for his late entry into professional football.

Rahmatganj MFS
On 1 July 2018, Sohel joined Rahmatganj MFS and made his professional league debut by playing full 90 minutes against Abahani Limited Dhaka, on 2 February 2019. During his debut, Sohel registered an assist as his team lost the game 5–1. Although Sohel spent most of his career at the Bangladesh army as a forward, under coach Golam Jilani, Sohel played as a winger or a central midfielder supplying passes to the clubs Congolese talisman Siyo Zunapio, who scored 13 league goals that year, with all three assists Sohel provided the entire season being for the striker.

On 19 February 2019, Sohel scored his maiden professional league goal during a 2–2 against Muktijoddha Sangsad KC. He scored his second goal for the club during a surprise 2–1 against giants Chittagong Abahani Limited, on 16 May 2019. However, Sohel's next couple of goals came during defeats at the hands of NoFeL SC and Arambagh KS respectively. Sohel ended his first year in professional football with an impressive 4 goals and 3 assists to him name.

Chittagong Abahani Limited
On 1 October 2019, Sohel joined Chittagong Abahani Limited, under the guidance of the country's lone UEFA-A licensed coach, Maruful Haque. Sohel's first assignment at his new club was the 2019 Sheikh Kamal International Club Cup, where he played all five games as defending champions Abahani reached the final once more, defeating Gokulam Kerala from India 3–2, with Sohel assisting the winner from Chinedu Matthew. However, he was unable to win his first silverware with the club as, they were defeated by Malaysian side Terengganu FC in the final. Sohel was unable to make his league debut that season as, the 2019–20 Bangladesh Premier League was cancelled.

On 18 January 2021, Sohel finally made his league debut for Chittagong Abahani, during a game against Sheikh Jamal Dhanmondi Club. Nevertheless, he was not able to find a regular place in the starting lineup during the course of the season, this led to Maruful Haque converting Sohel into a defensive midfielder, the following year. The 2021–22 campaign was Sohel's breakthrough season as, he was called up to the Bangladesh national football team by coach Javier Cabrera, after his impressive performances during the domestic cup and league. On 4 March 2022, Sohel scored his first league goal for Chittagong Abahani which also came against Muktijoddha Sangsad KC. He finished the season with 21 league appearances, registering one goal and four assists. Sohel missed only a single game the entire season due to a suspension and was shown a red card in his last game for the club, on 1 August 2022, against Bangladesh Police FC. He made 51 appearances in all competitions for the club and managed get seven assist and a single goal during his three years stay.

Abahani Limited Dhaka
On 5 August 2022, Sohel joined Abahani Limited Dhaka, after his contract with the Chittagong-based side expired.

International career
On 14 May 2022, Sohel was called up to the Bangladesh national team preliminary squad for the then upcoming 2023 AFC Asian Cup qualification – Third Round. However, due to passport complications Sohel was not able to join the final 23-man squad.

On 22 September 2022, Sohel made his debut for the Bangladesh national team in a friendly match against Cambodia, by replacing Jamal Bhuyan at the start of the second half.

Career statistics

Club

International

References

External links 
 
 Mohamed Sohel Rana at soccerway.com

Living people
1996 births
People from Comilla
Association football midfielders
Rahmatganj MFS players
Abahani Limited (Chittagong) players
Abahani Limited (Dhaka) players
Bangladesh Football Premier League players
Bangladeshi footballers
Bangladesh international footballers